Fugitive Road is a 1934 American comedy drama film directed by Frank R. Strayer and starring Erich von Stroheim, Wera Engels and Leslie Fenton. It is set a border post in Austria following World War I. A variety of different people trying to cross the border end up stranded there, including an American gangster and a naïve young Russian woman hoping to sail to New York to join her brother.

It was shot at the Universal Studios with sets designed by the art director Edward C. Jewell.

Cast
 Erich von Stroheim as Hauptmann Oswald Von Traunsee 
 Wera Engels as Sonya Valinoff  
 Leslie Fenton as Frank Riker  
 George Humbert as Papa Vinocchio  
 Hank Mann as Johann, Traunsee's orderly  
 Harry Holman as Burgomaster  
 Ferdinand Schumann-Heink as Doctor  
 Michael Visaroff as Police capt. with moustache 
 Wilhelm von Brincken as Lieutenant Berne  
 Harry Allen as Herbert Smythe, ambulance driver  
 Anna Demetrio as Mama Vinocchio  
 Leonid Kinskey as Nicholas Petrovich, tall smuggler
 Florence Enright as Burgomaster's Wife  
 Harry Schultz as Sergeant  
 Edith Kingdon as Tourist  
 Vangie Beilby as Tourist  
 Hans Fuerberg as Second Lieutenant

References

Bibliography
 Michael R. Pitts. Poverty Row Studios, 1929–1940: An Illustrated History of 55 Independent Film Companies, with a Filmography for Each. McFarland & Company, 2005.

External links

Fugitive Road at TV Guide (a slightly different version of this 1987 write-up was originally published in The Motion Picture Guide)

1934 films
1934 comedy-drama films
American comedy-drama films
American black-and-white films
Films directed by Frank R. Strayer
Chesterfield Pictures films
Films set in Austria
Films set in the 1910s
1930s English-language films
1930s American films